Irikkur is a town and grama panchayat in Kannur District of Kerala state, India.

Location
Irikkur is located on SH 36 between the towns of Taliparamba and Iritty and directly accessible from Kannur, Mattanur and Thalassery.

History

Irikkur has historic and commercial importance, and is one of the largest Muslim majority towns (76%) in Kannur district and lies on the banks of the Irikkur River, locally known as the "Ayippuzha".  This river was the geographical border of the former Kottayam Kingdom ruled by Kerala Varma Pazhassi Raja.

Demography
As of 2011 Census, Irikkur had a population of 13,820 of which 6,690 are males while 7,130 are females. It is also authorized to build roads within Census Town limits and impose taxes on properties coming under its jurisdiction.

In Irikkur, Female Sex Ratio is of 1066 against state average of 1084. Moreover, Child Sex Ratio is around 991 compared to Kerala state average of 964. Literacy rate of Irikkur is 92.03 % lower than state average of 94.00 %. In Irikkur, Male literacy is around 96.30 % while female literacy rate is 88.08 %.

Transportation

National Highway (NH 66) passes through Taliparamba town.  Mangalore and Mumbai can be accessed on the northern side and Cochin and Thiruvananthapuram can be accessed on the southern side. 
State Highway (SH 36) passes through Irikkur town connects with Taliparamba and Iritty. The road towards the east of Iritty connects to Mysore and Bangalore.

The nearest railway station is Kannur on Shoranur-Mangalore Section line. There are airports at Mangalore and Kannur.

Geography

Tourism
Irikkur Assembly constituency has a major role in tourism in Kannur district as it covers mainly hilly regions bordering Western ghats with serene environment. Paithalmala, Palakkayam thattu, Kanjirakolli and Kappimala are the main tourist destinations in Irikkur constituency that enhances huge inflow of tourists. Irikkur is being promoted as the tourism hub of Malabar providing adequate infrastructure and accommodation facilities which lacks currently being planned in the region through investors global meet and tourism meet to be held here.

Educational Institutions
 SIBGA Institute of Advanced Studies, Irikkur
 Govt HSS, Irikkur
 Rahmaniya Orphanage HSS, Irikkur

Religion

Approximately 76% of the population consists of Muslims

 Mamanikkunn temple, one of the famous Hindu temples of Kerala.
 20 mosques, out of which allow to pray
 A Christian seminary

Politics

Irikkur assembly constituency is part of Kannur Lok Sabha constituency. The current MLA of Irikkur is Sajeev Joseph from INC who won in the 2021 Kerala Legislative Assembly election with a vote share of 50.33%.

References 

Cities and towns in Kannur district
Villages near Irikkur